Deerfield is an unincorporated community in Pennington County, in the U.S. state of South Dakota.

History
A post office called Deerfield was established in 1892, and remained in operation until 1954. The community was so named on account of the area being a favorite hunting ground of deer.

References

Unincorporated communities in Pennington County, South Dakota
Unincorporated communities in South Dakota